Embla is a Scandinavian feminine given name. In Norse mythology, Embla was the first woman.

People with the name Embla include:

Embla Hjulström (born 1994), Swedish actress
Embla Kristínardóttir (born 1995), Icelandic basketball player

Swedish feminine given names
Scandinavian feminine given names